Fordham Road may refer to:

 Fordham Road, a major street in The Bronx borough of New York City

Subway stations

New York City
Fordham Road (IRT Jerome Avenue Line), serving the  train
Fordham Road (IND Concourse Line), serving the  trains
Fordham Road – 190th Street (IRT Third Avenue Line), a former elevated station at Third Avenue

Boston
Fordham Road station (MBTA), in Boston (Massachusetts, USA)